Volume 1 is the re-released and partially re-packed version of the first album by punk band Reagan Youth.  Originally released in 1984 as Youth Anthems for the New Order, the album recorded at High 5 Studios, New York City, from 1983-early 1984.  Volume 1 contains three new tracks and several different takes of songs recorded during the Youth Anthems for the New Order sessions.

Track listing
 "Reagan Youth" – 1:15   
 "New Aryans" – 1:17   
 "(Are You) Happy?" – 1:33   
 "No Class" – 1:34   
 "I Hate Hate" – 1:58   
 "Degenerated" – 2:22
 "Go Nowhere" – 1:22   
 "USA" – 1:22   
 "Anytown" – 2:00   
 "In Dog We Trust" – 2:50

Personnel
 "Dave Insurgent" (Dave Rubinstein) - Vocals
 "Paul Cripple" (Paul Bakija) - Guitar
 Al Pike - Bass
 Steve Weinstein - Drums
 Jerry Williams - Engineer
 Mixed and Produced - Reagan Youth

Reagan Youth albums
1988 albums